Split Rock Dam is a minor ungated concrete faced rock fill embankment dam with concrete chute spillway across the Manilla River upstream of Manilla in the north-western slopes region of New South Wales, Australia. The dam's purpose includes flood mitigation, irrigation, water supply and conservation. The impounded reservoir is called Split Rock Reservoir.

Location and features
The dam was built by Abignano Pty Limited on behalf of the New South Wales Department of Land and Water Conservation to supply water for irrigation, flood mitigation and potable water for towns in the Namoi Valley, including Manilla and Barraba. Together with Keepit Dam, Split Rock Dam supplies extensive irrigation water in the Namoi Valley. The dams also supply water for the town of Walgett and generates hydro-power for the national grid.

The concrete chute spillway is capable of discharging .

At the time of its initial construction in 1987, Split Rock Dam incorporated the latest dam technology with an intake tower that can select water from any specified depth. This ensures that cold, de-oxygenated water from lower levels is mixed with water that contains more oxygen from the warmer layers above, before it leaves the storage.

In 2013, Tamworth Regional Council announced a project to construct a  pipeline from Split Rock Dam to Barraba to ensure local residents have access to a quality water supply would proceed. Additional project infrastructure includes a pumping station near the dam, a pressure tank, and upgrades to Barrabra water treatment plant.

The dam is named after a fissure in a large rock near the dam site.

Recreation

The reservoir has recreational opportunities including camping areas and facilities for launching ski boats and sailing boats. There are toilet, barbecue, picnic, and camping facilities as well as a boat ramp. Boat access is restricted near the dam wall. The reservoir contains fish species such as Murray cod, golden perch, silver perch, eel-tailed catfish and carp.

On the reservoir's northern shore is Glen Riddle Recreation Reserve, a  nature reserve with toilets, picnic and camping facilities.

See also

 Irrigation in Australia
 Keepit Dam
 List of dams and reservoirs in New South Wales

References

External links
 

Dams in New South Wales
Dams completed in 1987
North West Slopes